Elliot Christopher Cowdin I (August 8, 1819 - April 12, 1880) was an American businessman and politician. He served one term in the New York State Assembly in 1876, representing the 11th district.

Life 
Elliot C. Cowdin was the son of Angier and Abiah (Carter) Cowdin. He born in on August 8, 1819, in Jamaica, Vermont, but grew up mainly in Boston, Massachusetts, where the family moved to after his father's death.

Cowdin became involved in the silk trade in the 1840s and, in 1852, he moved to New York City to establish his own business, Elliot C. Cowdin & Company, an importing firm that specialized in "ribbons, silks, flowers and other Paris novelties."  The business had a branch office in Paris, France and Cowdin maintained a second home there. He was also active in politics; as a speaker and lecturer; and in several civic organizations, including the New York Chamber of Commerce, the New England Society of New York, the Bedford Farmers' Club, and the Union League, which he had helped to found.

Cowdin married Sarah Katharine Waldron (1827-1903), the daughter of Samuel W. and Martha (Melcher) Waldron, on September 13, 1853. They had six children: Katharine W., John Elliot, Martha G., Winthrop, Alice, and Elliot.

Elliot Cowdin died at his home in New York on April 12, 1880.

Political career 
Cowdin held some appointed posts in government, including that of U.S. Commissioner to the Paris Expedition in 1867.  He was also a member of the 100th New York State Legislature in 1876, elected to the New York State Assembly as a Republican representative of the 11th District (New York County). His interests as an Assemblyman, as indicated by the bills he introduced, included government reform, taxation and finance, and trade and commerce.  Cowdin served just one term, declining afterward to run for reelection.

References

External links 
Elliot C. Cowdin at The Political Graveyard

Guide to the Report to the Department of State on Silk and Silk Manufacture 1868

1819 births
1880 deaths
People from Jamaica, Vermont
Republican Party members of the New York State Assembly
19th-century American politicians